Valerian Petrovych Pidmohylny (Ukrainian: Валер'ян Петрович Підмогильний; 2 February 1901 - 3 November 1937) was a Ukrainian modernist, most famous for the realist novel Misto (The City).  Like a number of Ukrainian writers, he flourished in 1920s Ukraine, but was finally constrained and eventually arrested by the Soviet authorities. Pidmohylny was executed by the Soviets in Sandarmokh. He is one of the leading figures of the Executed Renaissance.

Biography 

Pidmohylny was born in Ekaterinoslav Governorate (now Dnipropetrovsk Oblast, Ukraine).  His father was a manager for a large landowner.  He learned French as a child and continued his efforts, eventually becoming a major translator of French literature into Ukrainian, in particular the works of Anatole France and Guy de Maupassant.

His early adult life is sketchy, but there is a slight indication that he was a supporter of Symon Petliura, the military commander of the short-lived independent Ukraine created after the Soviet Revolution.

Living in Kiev, but having difficulty publishing some of his stories in 1923, he was able to secure publication in the anti-Soviet émigré journal Nova Ukraina.  This created disagreements with other Ukrainian writers including Khvyl'ovyi, one of the leading writers of the period.

Pidmohylny published a wide number of stories in the next several years after having been "exonerated" by the major Ukrainian journal Chervonyi shliakh.  He also participated in the literary group Lanka tied to the journal Zhyttia i revoliutsiia. In addition to prose fiction and translations, he also published several critical essays, and is considered one of the pioneers of Freudian criticism in Ukraine.

In 1927, at the age of 26, Pidmohylny won recognition as a major author with the publication of his novel Misto (The City), which was also translated into Russian.

As harsh Stalinism solidified in Ukraine, Pidmohylny had increasing difficulty publishing his work, especially magnified because of questions of his commitment to the Soviet system.  In 1934, he was arrested. After being tortured and forced to sign absurd confessions, he was sentenced to the Solovki prison camp and shot in Sandarmokh, Karelia.

After Stalin’s death, Pidmohylny was partially rehabilitated in 1956.

Major works
 Misto
The novel Misto is the story of a young man thrust into the violent sights and smells of an urban environment and has been translated into English.

 A Little Touch of Drama
The novel A Little Touch of Drama (Ukrainian: Невеличка драма), originally only published in serialization, describes the character types of a number of men who compete for the love of one woman.  One of her primary admirers is a scientist, and a major theme is the tension between the administration of reason-based science and human emotional life. It is available in English translation.

See also

 The City (novel)
 List of Ukrainian-language writers
 Ukrainian literature

References

External links

A biographical essay about Pidmohylny in English 
Pidmohylny's writings in Ukrainian, with some English translations, Valeriian Pidmohyl'nyi

Ukrainian writers
1901 births
1937 deaths
Ukrainian lexicographers
Ukrainian translators
Oles Honchar Dnipro National University alumni
Great Purge victims from Ukraine
Soviet rehabilitations
Gulag detainees
20th-century translators
20th-century lexicographers
People convicted in relations with the Organization of Ukrainian Nationalists